Gianluca Capitano (born 4 August 1971) is an Italian cyclist. He competed in two events at the 1996 Summer Olympics.

References

External links
 

1971 births
Living people
Italian male cyclists
Olympic cyclists of Italy
Cyclists at the 1996 Summer Olympics
Sportspeople from Chieti
20th-century Italian people
21st-century Italian people